Hadsund BK is a football club from Denmark currently playing in the Denmark Series. They play at Hadsund Hallerne in Hadsund, Jutland, which has a capacity of 2,000.

Football clubs in Denmark
Association football clubs established in 1926
Hadsund